Clive Barriffe (born 1955) is a Jamaican former track and field athlete who competed in the 400 metres hurdles and the 4×400 metres relay. He was the silver medallist with the Jamaican relay team at the 1978 Commonwealth Games, running in a team including Bertland Cameron, Colin Bradford and Floyd Brown. He also placed sixth individually in the hurdles at that competition. That same year he was a relay champion with Jamaica at the 1978 Central American and Caribbean Games.

References

1955 births
Living people
Jamaican male hurdlers
Athletes (track and field) at the 1978 Commonwealth Games
Commonwealth Games medallists in athletics
Commonwealth Games silver medallists for Jamaica
Central American and Caribbean Games gold medalists for Jamaica
Competitors at the 1978 Central American and Caribbean Games
Central American and Caribbean Games medalists in athletics
Medallists at the 1978 Commonwealth Games